Typhlodaphne purissima is a species of sea snail, a marine gastropod mollusk in the family Borsoniidae.

Description
The shell grows to a length of 27 mm.

Distribution
This marine species occurs off Argentina, Tierra del Fuego and South Georgia Islands at depths between 94 m and 160 m.

References

 Strebel, 1908. Wissenschaftliche Ergebnisse der Schwedischen Südpolar-Expedition, 1901–1903

External links
 
  Bouchet P., Kantor Yu.I., Sysoev A. & Puillandre N. (2011) A new operational classification of the Conoidea. Journal of Molluscan Studies 77: 273–308
  Griffiths, H.J.; Linse, K.; Crame, J.A. (2003). SOMBASE - Southern Ocean mollusc database: a tool for biogeographic analysis in diversity and evolution. Organisms Diversity and Evolution. 3: 207–213
 Kantor Y.I., Harasewych M.G. & Puillandre N. (2016). A critical review of Antarctic Conoidea (Neogastropoda). Molluscan Research. 36(3): 153–206

purissima
Gastropods described in 1908